The 2015–16 Scottish League Cup final was the 70th final of the Scottish League Cup. The final took place on 13 March 2016 at Hampden Park, Glasgow. The clubs contesting the final were Hibernian and Ross County, with Ross County winning 2–1 with a last minute goal. The win was Ross County's first major trophy in senior football.

This final is the most recent to be played in March, as from the 2016–17 season the Scottish League Cup reverted to being played during the first part of the season.

Route to the final

Hibernian entered the League Cup in the first round, whilst Ross County entered in the second round.

Hibernian

In the first round Hibernian faced a home tie against Scottish League Two side Montrose. Hibs progressed with goals from Scott Martin, Scott Allan and Jason Cummings.

Hibernian drew Scottish League One opposition in the second round in the shape of Stranraer. An own goal from Scott Rumsby saw Hibernian take their place in the third round.

In the third round Hibernian faced Scottish Premiership side Aberdeen. Late goals from Jason Cummings and Dominique Malonga sealed their passage into the quarter-finals.

Hibernian faced Dundee United in the quarter-finals. Goals from David Gray, Jason Cummings and Lewis Stevenson saw the Edinburgh side claim their place in the semi-finals.

Hibernian beat St Johnstone in the semi-final with goals from Jason Cummings and John McGinn. This sent Alan Stubbs' side to their first League Cup final since 2007.

Ross County

Ross County drew Scottish League One side Ayr United in the second round of the League Cup. Goals from Liam Boyce in the first half and Michael Gardyne in the second were enough to send the Staggies through to the next round.

In the third round Ross County faced Scottish Championship side Falkirk in Dingwall. An emphatic 7–0 victory, which included goals from Raffaele De Vita, Jonathan Franks, Brian Graham, Darren Holden and a Liam Boyce hat-trick, saw Ross County ease into the quarter-finals.

Ross County were the victors against their Highland neighbours Inverness Caledonian Thistle. Goals from Irvine and Gardyne were enough to see County into their first ever League Cup semi-final.

Ross County beat favourites Celtic 3–1, in a match which saw the Bhoys miss a penalty and reduced to 10 players. Goals from Martin Woods, Paul Quinn and Alex Schalk were enough to cancel out Gary Mackay-Steven's first-minute opener and see Ross County into their first ever League Cup final.

Match

Details

References

External links

2016
2
Hibernian F.C. matches
Ross County F.C. matches
2010s in Glasgow
Sports competitions in Glasgow
March 2016 sports events in the United Kingdom
League Cup final